Miguel Mayol (born 18 May 1981) is an Argentine rower. He participated in the 2012 Summer Olympics in London where he competed in the Men's lightweight double sculls event together with his teammate Mario Cejas. They qualified for the C finals, where they reached a fifth place, finishing in 17th place overall.

References

1981 births
Living people
Rowers at the 2012 Summer Olympics
Argentine male rowers
Olympic rowers of Argentina
Rowers at the 2011 Pan American Games
South American Games gold medalists for Argentina
South American Games medalists in rowing
Competitors at the 2010 South American Games
Pan American Games competitors for Argentina